Gavin Ice Piedmont is an ice piedmont in Trinity Peninsula, Antarctica, about  long and between  wide, extending from Charcot Bay to Russell West Glacier. It was mapped from surveys by the Falkland Islands Dependencies Survey (1960–61), and was named by the UK Antarctic Place-Names Committee for Christopher B. Gavin-Robinson, a pilot of the Falkland Islands and Dependencies Aerial Survey Expedition (1956–57).

References

Ice piedmonts of Graham Land
Landforms of Trinity Peninsula